Kushimoto Street is a business street located in Yenişehir, Mersin district of Mersin, southern Turkey.

Formerly known as the "4002 Street", it connects Gazi Mustafa Kemal Boulevard in the north with Adnan Menderes Boulevard in the south. In 1996, Mersin municipality renamed the street after Kushimoto, which is the Japanese twin city of Mersin. Kushimoto hosts the Turkish Memorial and Museum in commemoration of the 1890-sunken Ottoman frigate Ertuğrul .

Presently, the street, as well as the four intersecting second level streets, have a wide variety of shops and restaurants. A small park is situated to the west of the Kushimoto Street.

References

Streets in Mersin
Shopping districts and streets in Turkey
Restaurant districts and streets in Turkey
Yenişehir, Mersin
Japan–Turkey relations